The 1874 Princeton Tigers football team represented the College of New Jersey, then more commonly known as Princeton College, in the 1874 college football season. The team beat Columbia and Rutgers by identical 6–0 scores, finished with a 2–0 record, and was retroactively named national champion by the Billingsley Report and as co-national champion by Parke H. Davis. Isaac H. Lionberger was the team's captain.

This season marked the third of four consecutive national championships, and one of 11 in a 13-year period between 1869 and 1881.

Schedule

References

Princeton
Princeton Tigers football seasons
College football national champions
College football undefeated seasons
Princeton Tigers football